Antinomianism (Ancient Greek: ἀντί [anti] "against" and νόμος [nomos] "law") is any view which rejects laws or legalism and argues against moral, religious or social norms (Latin: mores), or is at least considered to do so. The term has both religious and secular meanings.

In some Christian belief systems, an antinomian is one who takes the principle of salvation by faith and divine grace to the point of asserting that the saved are not bound to follow the moral law contained in the Ten Commandments. Antinomians believe that faith alone guarantees eternal security in heaven, regardless of one's actions.

The distinction between antinomian and other Christian views on moral law is that antinomians believe that obedience to the law is motivated by an internal principle flowing from belief rather than from any external compulsion. Antinomianism has been considered to teach that believers have a "license to sin" and that future sins don't require repentance. Johann Agricola, to whom Antinomianism was first attributed, stated "If you sin, be happy, it should have no consequence."

Examples of antinomians being confronted by the religious establishment include Martin Luther's critique of antinomianism and the Antinomian Controversy of the seventeenth-century Massachusetts Bay Colony. In Lutheranism and Methodism, antinomianism is a heresy.

By extension, the word "antinomian" is used to describe views in religions other than Christianity:
 the 10th century Sufi mystic al-Hallaj was accused of antinomianism
 the term is also used to describe certain practices or traditions in Frankism
 aspects of Vajrayana and Tantra that include sexual rituals are sometimes described as "antinomian" for Buddhism and Hinduism

Christian views on antinomianism
Antinomianism has been a point of doctrinal contention in the history of Christianity, especially in Protestantism, given the Protestant belief in justification through faith alone versus justification on the basis of merit or good works or works of mercy. Most Protestants consider themselves saved without having to keep the commandments of the Mosaic law as a whole; that is, their salvation does not depend upon keeping the Mosaic law. However, salvific faith is generally seen as one that produces obedience, consistent with the reformed formula, "We are justified by faith alone but not by a faith that is alone," in contrast to rejecting moral constraint.

The term antinomianism was coined by Martin Luther during the Reformation to criticize extreme interpretations of the new Lutheran soteriology.  In the 18th century, John Wesley, the founder of the Methodist tradition, severely attacked antinomianism.

A general consensus has been historically reached as to which laws of the Old Testament Christians are still enjoined to keep. These moral laws, as opposed to civil or ceremonial laws, are derivative of what St. Paul indirectly refers to as natural law (Rm 2.14–15). Mosaic law has authority only insofar as it reflects the commands of Christ and the natural law. Christian sects and theologians who believe that they are freed from more moral constraint than is customary are often called "antinomian" by their critics. Thus, classic Methodist commentator Adam Clarke held, "The Gospel proclaims liberty from the ceremonial law, but binds you still faster under the moral law. To be freed from the ceremonial law is the Gospel liberty; to pretend freedom from the moral law is Antinomianism."

Antinomianism in Gnosticism
The term antinomian came into use in the sixteenth century; however, the doctrine itself can be traced in the teaching of earlier beliefs. Early Gnostic sects were accused of failing to follow the Mosaic Law in a manner that suggests the modern term "antinomian". Most Gnostic sects did not accept the Old Testament moral law. For example, the Manichaeans held that their spiritual being was unaffected by the action of matter and regarded carnal sins as being, at worst, forms of bodily disease.

Marcion of Sinope was the founder of Marcionism which rejected the Hebrew Bible in its entirety. Marcion considered the God portrayed in the Bible to be a lesser deity, a demiurge, and he claimed that the law of Moses was contrived.
Such deviations from the moral law were criticized by proto-orthodox rivals of the Gnostics, who ascribed various aberrant and licentious acts to them.

Lutheran views
The term "antinomianism" was coined by Martin Luther during the Reformation, to criticize extreme interpretations of the new Lutheran soteriology. The Lutheran Church benefited from early antinomian controversies by becoming more precise in distinguishing between law and gospel and justification and sanctification. Martin Luther developed 258 theses during his six antinomian disputations, which continue to provide doctrinal guidance to Lutherans today.

Upon hearing that he was being charged with the rejection of the Old Testament moral law, Luther responded: "And truly, I wonder exceedingly, how it came to be imputed to me, that I should reject the Law or Ten Commandments, there being extant so many of my own expositions (and those of several sorts) upon the Commandments, which also are daily expounded, and used in our Churches, to say nothing of the Confession and Apology, and other books of ours." In his "Introduction to Romans," Luther stated that saving faith is,

First antinomian controversy
As early as 1525, Johannes Agricola advanced his idea, in his commentary on Luke, that the law was a futile attempt of God to work the restoration of mankind. He maintained that non-Christians were still held to the Mosaic law, while Christians were entirely free from it, being under the Gospel alone.  He viewed sin as a malady or impurity rather than an offense that rendered the sinner guilty and damnable before God. The sinner was the subject of God's pity rather than of his wrath. To Agricola, the purpose of repentance was to abstain from evil rather than the contrition of a guilty conscience. The law had no role in repentance, which came about after one came to faith, and repentance was caused by the knowledge of the love of God alone.

In contrast, Philipp Melanchthon urged that repentance must precede faith and that knowledge of the moral law is needed to produce repentance. He later wrote in the Augsburg Confession that repentance has two parts. "One is contrition, that is, terrors smiting the conscience through the knowledge of sin; the other is faith, which is born of the Gospel, or of absolution, and believes that for Christ's sake, sins are forgiven, comforts the conscience, and delivers it from terrors."

Shortly after Melanchthon drew up the 1527 Articles of Visitation in June, Agricola began to be verbally aggressive toward him, but Martin Luther succeeded in smoothing out the difficulty at Torgau in December 1527. However, Agricola did not change his ideas and later depicted Luther as disagreeing with him. After Agricola moved to Wittenberg, he maintained that the law must be used in the courthouse but it must not be used in the church. He said that repentance comes from hearing the good news only and does not precede but rather follows faith. He continued to disseminate this doctrine in books, despite receiving various warnings from Luther.

Luther, with reluctance, at last, believed that he had to make a public comment against antinomianism and its promoters in 1538 and 1539. Agricola apparently yielded, and Luther's book Against the Antinomians (1539) was to serve as Agricola's recantation. This was the first use of the term Antinomian. But the conflict flared up again, and Agricola sued Luther. He said that Luther had slandered him in his disputations, Against the Antinomians, and in his On the Councils and Churches (1539). But before the case could be brought to trial, Agricola left the city, even though he had bound himself to remain at Wittenberg, and moved to Berlin where he had been offered a position as preacher to the court. After his arrival there, he made peace with the Saxons, acknowledged his "error", and gradually conformed his doctrine to that which he had before opposed and assailed. He still used such terms as gospel and repentance in a different manner from Luther's.

Second antinomian controversy

The antinomian doctrine, however, was not eliminated from Lutheranism. Melanchthon and those who agreed with him, called Philippists, were checked by the Gnesio-Lutherans in the Second Antinomian Controversy during the Augsburg Interim. The Philippists ascribed to the Gospel alone the ability to work repentance, to the exclusion of the law. They blurred the distinction between Law and Gospel by considering the Gospel itself to be a moral law. They did not identify Christ's fulfillment of the law with the commandments which humans are expected to follow.

As a result, the Book of Concord rejects antinomianism in the last confession of faith. The Formula of Concord rejects antinomianism in the fifth article, On the Law and the Gospel and in the sixth article, On the Third Use of the Law.

Reformed views

The Articles of the Church of England, Revised and altered by the Assembly of Divines, at Westminster, in the year 1643 condemns antinomianism, teaching that "no Christian man whatsoever is free from the obedience of the commandments which are called moral. By the moral law, we understand all the Ten Commandments taken to their full extent." The Westminster Confession, held by Presbyterian Churches, holds that the moral law contained in the Ten Commandments "does forever bind all, as well justified persons as others, to the obedience thereof". The Westminster Confession of Faith further states: "Faith, thus receiving and resting on Christ and His righteousness, is the alone instrument of justification; yet it is not alone in the person justified, but is ever accompanied with all other saving graces, and is no dead faith, but works by love."

However, a number of seventeenth-century English writers in the Reformed tradition held antinomian beliefs. None of these individuals argued that Christians would not obey the law. Instead, they believed that believers would spontaneously obey the law without external motivation. Antinomianism during this period is likely a reaction against Arminianism, as it emphasized free grace in salvation to the detriment of any participation on the part of the believer. John Eaton (fl. 1619) is often identified as the father of English antinomianism. Tobias Crisp (1600–1643), a Church of England priest who had been Arminian and was later accused of being an antinomian. He was a divisive figure for English Calvinists, with a serious controversy arising from the republication of his works in the 1690s. Also lesser known was John Saltmarsh (priest).

From the latter part of the 18th century, critics of Calvinists accused them of antinomianism. Such charges were frequently raised by Arminian Methodists, who subscribed to a synergistic soteriology that contrasted with Calvinism's monergistic doctrine of justification. The controversy between Arminian and Calvinistic Methodists produced the notable Arminian critique of Calvinism: Fletcher's Five Checks to Antinomianism (1771–75).

Methodist views
John Wesley, the founder of the Methodist tradition, harshly criticized antinomianism, considering it the "worst of all heresies". He taught that Christian believers are bound to follow the moral law and that they are to partake in the means of grace for their sanctification. Methodists teach the necessity of following the moral law as contained in the Ten Commandments, citing Jesus' teaching, "If ye love me, keep my commandments" (cf. John 14:15).

Quaker views
Religious Society of Friends were charged with antinomianism due to their rejection of a graduate clergy and a clerical administrative structure, as well as their reliance on the Spirit (as revealed by the Inner Light of God within each person) rather than the Scriptures. They also rejected civil legal authorities and their laws (such as the paying of tithes to the State church and the swearing of oaths) when they were seen as inconsistent with the promptings of the Inner Light of God.

Antinomian charges against other groups
Other Protestant groups that have been accused of antinomianism include the Anabaptists and Mennonites. The Ranters of 17th century England were one of the most outright antinomian sects in the history of Christianity. New Covenant Theology has been accused of antinomianism for their belief that the Ten Commandments have been abrogated, but they point out that nine of these ten are renewed under the New Covenant's Law of Christ. John Eaton, a leader in the antinomian underground during the 1630s, interpreted Revelation 12:1 with a quote recorded by Giles Firmin: "I saw a Woman Clothed with the Sun [That is, the Church Clothed with the righteousness of Christ, to her Justification] and the Moon, [that is, Sanctification] under her Feet."  Scholars have speculated that the "sun" and "light" may have been code-words used to surreptitiously reveal antinomian sympathies.

Biblical law in Christianity

The question of the obligation to follow the Mosaic Law was a point of contention in the Early Christian Church. Many early converts were Greek and thus had less interest in adherence to the Law of Moses than did the earliest Christians, who were primarily Jewish and already accustomed to the Law. Thus, as Christianity spread into new cultures, the early church was pressured by Judaizers and Pharisees to decide which laws were still required of Christians, and which were no longer required under the New Covenant. The New Testament, (especially the book of Acts) is interpreted by some as recording the church slowly abandoning the "ritual laws" of Judaism, such as circumcision, Sabbath and kosher law, while remaining in full agreement on adherence to the "divine law", or Jewish laws on morality, such as the Ten Commandments. Thus, the early Christian church incorporated ideas sometimes seen as partially antinomian or parallel to Dual-covenant theology, while still upholding the traditional laws of moral behavior.

The first major dispute over Christian antinomianism was a dispute over whether circumcision was required of Christians. This happened at the Council of Jerusalem, which is dated to about 50 AD and recorded in the Acts of the Apostles:

The apostles and elders met at Jerusalem, and after a spirited discussion, their conclusion, later called the Apostolic Decree, possibly a major act of differentiation of the Church from its Jewish roots (the first being the idea that Jesus was the messiah), was recorded in :

Beginning with Augustine of Hippo, many have seen a connection to Noahide Law, while some modern scholars reject the connection to Noahide Law and instead see Lev 17–18 as the basis.

James sets out a preliminary list of commands which Gentiles should obey. Gentiles were not required to be circumcised but were required to obey the four beginning requirements to be part of the larger congregation. This passage shows that the remainder of the commandments would follow as they studied "Moses" in the Synagogues. James's list still includes some dietary commands, but many of those also passed out of some Christian traditions quite early.  describes the following vision, which was used to excuse early gentile Christians from the Mosaic dietary laws.

Peter was perplexed about the vision in Acts 10. His subsequent explanation of the vision in Acts 11 gives no credence to antinomianism as it relates to the admission of Gentiles into covenant relationship with God.

Though the Apostolic Decree is no longer observed by many Christian denominations today, it is still observed in full by the Greek Orthodox. The Ethiopian Orthodox Tewahedo Church also preserves many Judaic customs.

In the Letter to the Hebrews, it is written that under the Old Testament Law, priests had to be from the tribe of Levi, Aaron, and his sons:

It is pointed out that Jesus was from the tribe of Judah, and thus Jesus could not be a priest under the Old Testament Law, as Jesus is not a descendant of Aaron. It states that the Law had to change for Jesus to be the High Priest: "For when there is a change of the priesthood, there must also be a change of the law." (Hebrews 7:12)

Supporting Pauline passages

The Apostle Paul, in his Letters, says that believers are saved by the unearned grace of God, not by good works, "lest anyone should boast", and placed a priority on orthodoxy (right belief) before orthopraxy (right practice). The soteriology of Paul's statements in this matter has long been a matter of dispute. In what has become the modern Protestant orthodoxy, however, this passage is interpreted as a reference to justification by trusting Christ.

Paul used the term freedom in Christ, for example, . Some understood this to mean "lawlessness" (i.e. not obeying Mosaic Law).

In  James the Just explained his situation to Paul:

 is sometimes presented as proof of Paul's antinomistic views. For example, the NIV translates these verses: "... he forgave us all our sins, having canceled the written code, with its regulations, that was against us and that stood opposed to us; he took it away, nailing it to the cross." But, the NRSV translates this same verse as: "... he forgave us all our trespasses, erasing the record that stood against us with its legal demands. He set this aside, nailing it to the cross." This latter translation makes it sound as though it is a record of trespasses, rather than the Law itself, that was "nailed to the cross." The interpretation partly depends on the original Greek word  which, according to Strong's G5498, literally means "something written by hand;" it is variously translated as "the bond" (RSV, NAB), "written code" (NIV), or "record" (ESV, NRSV, CEB), as in a record of debt.

2 Corinthians 3:6–17 says,
"Who also hath made us able ministers of the new testament; not of the letter, but of the spirit: for the letter killeth, but the spirit giveth life. But if the ministration of death, written and engraven in stones, was glorious, so that the children of Israel could not stedfastly behold the face of Moses for the glory of his countenance; which glory was to be done away: How shall not the ministration of the spirit be rather glorious? For if the ministration of condemnation be glory, much more doth the ministration of righteousness exceed in glory. For even that which was made glorious had no glory in this respect, by reason of the glory that excelleth. For if that which is done away was glorious, much more that which remaineth is glorious. Seeing then that we have such hope, we use great plainness of speech: And not as Moses, which put a veil over his face, that the children of Israel could not stedfastly look to the end of that which is abolished: But their minds were blinded: for until this day remaineth the same vail untaken away in the reading of the old testament; which vail is done away in Christ. But even unto this day, when Moses is read, the vail is upon their heart. Nevertheless when it shall turn to the Lord, the vail shall be taken away. Now the Lord is that Spirit: and where the Spirit of the Lord is, there is liberty." (KJV)

Some cite : "And by him all that believe are justified from all things, from which ye could not be justified by the law of Moses."  states twice that believers are not under the law: Romans 6:14 "For sin shall not have dominion over you: for ye are not under the law, but under grace." and Romans 6:15 "What then? shall we sin, because we are not under the law, but under grace? God forbid.". KJV

 describes the Galatians as "foolish" for relying on being observant to the Law: "(1) O foolish Galatians, who hath bewitched you, that ye should not obey the truth, before whose eyes Jesus Christ hath been evidently set forth, crucified among you? (2) This only would I learn of you, Received ye the Spirit by the works of the law, or by the hearing of faith? (3) Are ye so foolish? having begun in the Spirit, are ye now made perfect by the flesh? (4) Have ye suffered so many things in vain? if it be yet in vain. (5) He therefore that ministereth to you the Spirit, and worketh miracles among you, doeth he it by the works of the law, or by the hearing of faith?" KJV

 says that the purpose of the Law was to lead people to Christ, once people believe in Christ, they are no longer under the Law:
"(23) But before faith came, we were kept under the law, shut up unto the faith which should afterwards be revealed. (24) Wherefore the law was our schoolmaster to bring us unto Christ, that we might be justified by faith.(25) But after that faith is come, we are no longer under a schoolmaster." KJV

In , Paul compares the Old Covenant with the New Covenant. In this comparison, he equates each covenant with a woman, using the wives of Abraham as examples. The old covenant is equated with the slave woman, Hagar, and the new covenant is equated with the free woman Sarah.(). He concludes this example by saying that we are not children of the slave woman, but children of the free woman. In other words, we are not under the old covenant, we are under the new covenant.
"(22) For it is written, that Abraham had two sons, the one by a bondmaid, the other by a freewoman. (23) But he who was of the bondwoman was born after the flesh; but he of the freewoman was by promise. (24) Which things are an allegory: for these are the two covenants; the one from the mount Sinai, which gendereth to bondage, which is Agar. (25) For this Agar is mount Sinai in Arabia, and answereth to Jerusalem which now is, and is in bondage with her children. (26) But Jerusalem which is above is free, which is the mother of us all." KJV

 is sometimes translated: "For Christ is the end of the law for righteousness to every one that believeth" (KJV), or "Christ is the end of the law so that there may be righteousness for everyone who believes" (NRSV). The key word here is telos (Strong's G5056). Robert Badenas argues that telos is correctly translated as goal, not end, so that Christ is the goal of the Law. N. T. Wright in his New Testament for Everyone translates this verse as: "The Messiah, you see, is the goal of the law, so that covenant membership may be available for all who believe." Andy Gaus' version of the New Testament translates this verse as: "Christ is what the law aims at: for every believer to be on the right side of [God's] justice."

Also cited is : "He has abolished the law with its commandments and ordinances, that he might create in himself one new humanity in place of the two, thus making peace," NRSV. KJV

In Hebrews 8:6–7: "But the ministry Jesus has received is as superior to theirs as the covenant of which he is mediator is superior to the old one, and it is founded on better promises. For if there had been nothing wrong with that first covenant, no place would have been sought for another." It goes on to say that the problem with the first covenant was with the people who were supposed to keep it and that in the new covenant: "I will put my laws into their minds, and write them on their hearts, and I will be their God, and they shall be my people." 

The first covenant was said to be obsolete, and would soon disappear: "By calling this covenant "new," he has made the first one obsolete; and what is obsolete and aging will soon disappear." . Particularly the "stone tablets of the covenant" in Hebrews 9:4 referred directly to the Ten Commandments.
"Now the first covenant had regulations for worship and also an earthly sanctuary. A tabernacle was set up. In its first room were the lampstand, the table, and the consecrated bread; this was called the Holy Place. Behind the second curtain was a room called the Most Holy Place, which had the golden altar of incense and the gold-covered ark of the covenant. This ark contained the gold jar of manna, Aaron's staff that had budded, and the stone tablets of the covenant. Above the ark were the cherubim of the Glory, overshadowing the atonement cover." (Hebrews 9:1–5)

However, the notion that the Ten Commandments have been abrogated, as found in New Covenant Theology, is challenged by some.

Some scholars consider Jesus' Sermon on the Mount (particularly the Antitheses) to be an antitype of the proclamation of the Ten Commandments or Mosaic Covenant by Moses from the Biblical Mount Sinai.

Opposing Pauline passages
Those who oppose antinomianism invoke Paul as upholding obedience to the law:
 "Because the carnal mind is enmity against God: for it is not subject to the law of God, neither indeed can be. So then they that are in the flesh cannot please God."  KJV
 "But if any provide not for his own, and specially for those of his own house, he hath denied the faith, and is worse than an infidel."  KJV
 "But now I have written unto you not to keep company, if any man that is called a brother be a fornicator, or covetous, or an idolater, or a railer, or a drunkard, or an extortioner; with such an one no not to eat."  KJV
 "Children, obey your parents in the Lord: for this is right. Honour thy father and mother; which is the first commandment with promise;"  KJV
"Do we then make void the law through faith? God forbid: yea, we establish the law."  KJV
 "For as many as have sinned without law shall also perish without law: and as many as have sinned in the law shall be judged by the law; For not the hearers of the law are just before God, but the doers of the law shall be justified."  KJV
 "For this ye know, that no whoremonger, nor unclean person, nor covetous man, who is an idolater, hath any inheritance in the kingdom of Christ and of God. Let no man deceive you with vain words: for because of these things cometh the wrath of God upon the children of disobedience. "  KJV
 "Know ye not that the unrighteous shall not inherit the kingdom of God? Be not deceived: neither fornicators, nor idolaters, nor adulterers, nor effeminate, nor abusers of themselves with mankind, Nor thieves, nor covetous, nor drunkards, nor revilers, nor extortioners, shall inherit the kingdom of God."  KJV
 "Let your women keep silence in the churches: for it is not permitted unto them to speak; but they are commanded to be under obedience, as also saith the law."  KJV
 "Mortify therefore your members which are upon the earth; fornication, uncleanness, inordinate affection, evil concupiscence, and covetousness, which is idolatry."  KJV
 "Neither be ye idolaters, as were some of them; as it is written, The people sat down to eat and drink, and rose up to play."  KJV
 "Now the works of the flesh are manifest, which are these; Adultery, fornication, uncleanness, lasciviousness, Idolatry, witchcraft, hatred, variance, emulations, wrath, strife, seditions, heresies, Envyings, murders, drunkenness, revellings, and such like: of the which I tell you before, as I have also told you in time past, that they which do such things shall not inherit the kingdom of God."  KJV
 "Say I these things as a man? or saith not the law the same also? For it is written in the law of Moses, Thou shalt not muzzle the mouth of the ox that treadeth out the corn. Doth God take care for oxen?"  KJV
 "The wife is bound by the law as long as her husband liveth; but if her husband be dead, she is at liberty to be married to whom she will; only in the Lord."  KJV
 "Wherefore, my dearly beloved, flee from idolatry."  KJV
 "While he answered for himself, Neither against the law of the Jews, neither against the temple, nor yet against Cæsar, have I offended any thing at all."  KJV

Theology
The Catholic Encyclopedia (1910) article on "Judaizers" notes: "Paul, on the other hand, not only did not object to the observance of the Mosaic Law, as long as it did not interfere with the liberty of the Gentiles, but he conformed to its prescriptions when occasion required. Thus he shortly after the Council of Jerusalem circumcised Timothy, and he was in the very act of observing the Mosaic ritual when he was arrested at Jerusalem ( sqq.)."

The Jewish Encyclopedia article on "Gentile: Gentiles May Not Be Taught the Torah" notes the following reconciliation: "R. Emden, in a remarkable apology for Christianity contained in his appendix to "Seder 'Olam," gives it as his opinion that the original intention of Jesus, and especially of Paul, was to convert only the Gentiles to the seven moral laws of Noah and to let the Jews follow the Mosaic law — this explains the apparent contradictions in the New Testament regarding the laws of Moses and the Sabbath."

The Tübingen school of historians founded by F. C. Baur holds that in Early Christianity, there was a conflict between Pauline Christianity and the Jerusalem Church led by James the Just, Simon Peter, and John the Apostle, the so-called "Jewish Christians" or "Pillars of the Church." In many places Paul writes that he was an observant Jew and that Christians should "uphold the Law". In , part of the Incident at Antioch, Paul publicly accused Peter of judaizing. Even so, he says sins remain sins and upholds by several examples the kind of behaviour that the church should not tolerate (e.g.). In  he cites Jesus' teaching on divorce ("not I but the Lord") and does not reject it, but goes on to proclaim his own teaching ("I, not the Lord"), an extended counsel regarding a specific situation which some interpret as conforming to what the Lord said. But, this may mean he received direct knowledge of what the Lord wanted him to teach through the Holy Ghost.

Paul versus James

The Epistle of James, in contrast, states that we are to obey the Law of God and that "a person is justified by works and not by faith alone". Historically, this statement has been difficult for Protestants to reconcile with their belief in justification by faith alone as it appears to contradict Paul's teaching that works don't justify (Romans 4:1–8). Martin Luther, believing that his doctrines were refuted by James's conclusion that works also justify, suggested that the Epistle might be a forgery, and relegated it to an appendix in his Bible. Literature which discusses this includes the article on James 2:20 in Law and Gospel.

James also wrote: "For whoever keeps the whole law and yet stumbles at just one point is guilty of breaking all of it. For he who said, 'Do not commit adultery,' also said, 'Do not murder.' If you do not commit adultery but do commit murder, you have become a lawbreaker." . One interpretation is that people who want to keep the Old Testament Law must perfectly keep all of the Law—"an impossible task." James appeals to his readers to follow the "Royal Law of Love" instead of in the preceding verses (James 2:8–9). But the scholar Alister McGrath says that James was the leader of a Judaizing party that taught that Gentiles must obey the entire Mosaic Law.

Paul made a statement that appears to agree with James, saying that "both" faith produced as a result of repentance (the initial requirement for justification) "and" works (the evidence or proof of true faith) must exist together:
"So then, King Agrippa, I was not disobedient to the vision from heaven. First to those in Damascus, then to those in Jerusalem and in all Judea, and to the Gentiles also, I preached that they should repent and turn to God and prove their repentance by their deeds." Acts 26:19–20 (NIV)

Jesus

The Torah prescribes the death penalty for desecrating the Sabbath by working. To avoid any possibility of breaking the simple and few original Torah commands, the Pharisees formulated and added several thousand strict laws and numerous traditions which they treated as laws. According to the Christians, Jesus criticized the Pharisees for adding to the law. The Jewish Encyclopedia article on Jesus notes:
"Jesus, however, does not appear to have taken into account the fact that the Halakah was at this period just becoming crystallized, and that much variation existed as to its definite form; the disputes of Bet Hillel and Bet Shammai were occurring about the time of his maturity."

In the Gospel of Mark, Jesus' disciples were picking grain for food on the Sabbath. This was against one of the Pharisaic laws that had been added to the original Torah law which prohibited work on the Sabbath day. When the Pharisees challenged Jesus over breaking their law, he pointed to Biblical precedent and declared that "the Sabbath was made for man, not man for the Sabbath". Some claim Jesus rejected complete adherence to the Torah. Most scholars hold that Jesus did not reject the law, but directed that it should be obeyed in context. E. P. Sanders notes, "No substantial conflict existed between Jesus and the Pharisees with regard to Sabbath, food, and purity laws. ... The church took some while to come to the position that the Sabbath need not be kept, and it is hard to think that Jesus explicitly said so." There may be passages where the words of Jesus have been misinterpreted and were not really in contradiction with the Jewish law. Jesus never once broke the Torah, yet he did denounce the added Pharisaic rules and openly defied the Pharisees.

In the Gospel of Matthew, Jesus is sometimes said to refer to wicked people with the term ergazomenoi tēn anomian—e.g., . Due to this negative context, the term has almost always been translated as "evildoers", although it literally means "workers of lawlessness". In Hebrew, lawlessness would imply "Torahlessness". Matthew appears to present Jesus as equating wickedness with encouraging antinomianism. Scholars view Matthew as having been written by or for a Jewish audience, the so-called Jewish Christians. Several scholars argue that Matthew artificially lessened a claimed rejection of Jewish law so as not to alienate his intended audience. But, Jesus called for full adherence to the commandments He declared: "Do not think that I have come to abolish the Law or the Prophets; I have not come to abolish them but to fulfill them.".

 states: "Everyone who commits sin is guilty of lawlessness; sin is lawlessness."

Buddhist antinomianism
Among some Buddhist groups there are types of "antinomianism" that may act as a gloss for "left-handed attainment" (Sanskrit: vamachara): naturalist / spontaneous antinomianism, ritualist / philosophical antinomianism, and empirical antinomianism. There may also be those who subscribe to all or some combination of these three types. Not all Buddhist schools accept antinomian thought as skillful.

Naturalist antinomians believe that enlightened beings may spontaneously break monastic codes of conduct while living out a natural state of enlightened mind. Another view is that an enlightened mind responds to circumstances based on Buddhist morality, rather than the legalism of the monastic codes and that the "break" is not therefore spontaneous. There are tales of Buddhists who perform acts that appear to be bizarre or immoral, sometimes referred to as 'crazy wisdom' (Tibetan: yeshe chölwa). The movement of the Nyönpa in Seventeenth-Century Tibet has strong associations with antinomian behavior as well.

Ritualist antinomians, such as some Tantric Buddhists, may practice which seemingly may appear to be breaking the codes of conduct in specific religious rituals designed to teach non-duality or other philosophical concepts.

Empirical antinomians may break or disregard traditional ethical or moral rules that they believe are unconducive to the individual's contemplative life. They view such codification as having arisen in specific historical-cultural contexts and, as such, not always supportive of Buddhist training. Thus the individual and the community must test and verify which rules promote or hinder enlightenment.

Islamic antinomianism

In Islam, the law — which applies not only to religion, but also to areas such as politics, banking, and sexuality — is called sharīʿah, and traditionally draws from four primary sources:
 the Quran, which is Islam's central religious text;
 the Sunnah, which refers to actions practised during the time of the prophet Muḥammad, and is often thought to include the ḥadīth, or recorded words and deeds of Muḥammad;
 Ijmāʿ, which is the consensus of the ʿulamāʾ, or class of Islamic scholars, on points of practice;
 Qiyās, which—in Sunnī Islam—is a kind of analogical reasoning conducted by the ʿulamāʾ upon specific laws that have arisen through appeal to the first three sources; in Shia Islam, ʿaql ("reason") is used in place of qiyās

Actions, behavior, or beliefs that are considered to violate any or all of these four sources — primarily in matters of religion — can be termed "antinomian". Depending on the action, behavior, or belief in question, a number of different terms can be used to convey the sense of "antinomian": shirk ("association of another being with God"); bidʻah ("innovation"); kufr ("disbelief"); ḥarām ("forbidden"); etc.

As an example, the 10th century Sufi mystic al-Hallaj was executed for shirk for, among other things, his statement ana al-Ḥaqq, meaning "I am the Truth". As  al-Ḥaqq ("the Truth") is one of the Names of God in Islam, this would imply he was saying: "I am God." Expressions like these are known as šaṭḥiyyāt. Another individual who has often been termed antinomian is Ibn Arabi, a 12th and 13th-century scholar and mystic whose doctrine of waḥdat al-wujūd ("unity of being") has sometimes been interpreted as being pantheistic, and thus shirk.

Apart from individuals, entire groups of Muslims have also been called antinomian. One of these groups is the Nizārī Ismāʿīlī Shīʿa, who have always had strong millenarian tendencies arising partly from persecution directed at them by Sunnīs. Influenced to a certain extent by Gnosticism, the Ismāʿīlīs developed a number of beliefs and practices—such as their belief in the imamatte and an esoteric exegesis of the Qurʾān—that orthodox Sunnī Muslims considered being shirk and, hence, to be seen as antinomian. Certain other groups that evolved out of Shīʿah belief, such as the Alawites and the Bektashi Order, have also been considered antinomian. The Bektashis, particularly, have practices that diverge from conventional Islamic practice, such as the consumption of alcoholic beverages, the non-wearing of the ḥijāb ("veil") by women, and gathering in the cemevi in preference to the mosque.

Esoteric left-hand path

In Western esotericism the left-hand path and right-hand path are the dichotomy between two opposing approaches to magic. This terminology is used in various groups involved in the occult and ceremonial magic. In some definitions, the left-hand path is equated with malicious black magic or black shamanism, while the right-hand path with benevolent white magic. Other occultists have criticised this definition, believing that the left/right dichotomy refers merely to different kinds of working and does not necessarily connote good or bad magical actions.

Nonreligious antinomianism
George Orwell was a frequent user of "antinomian" in a secular (and always approving) sense. In his 1940 essay on Henry Miller, "Inside the Whale", the word appears several times, including one in which he calls A. E. Housman a writer in "a blasphemous, antinomian, 'cynical' strain", meaning defiant of arbitrary societal rules.

The psychologist, Nathan Adler, defined the "antinomian personality type" as "manifested by one whose frame of reference is threatened or has been disrupted. He suffers from a breakdown in the balance of his control and release mechanisms and from the permeability of his body boundaries."

In his study of late-20th-century western society the historian Eric Hobsbawm used the term in a sociological sense.

See also

 Abrogation of Old Covenant laws
 Antinomian controversy - 1630s Massachusetts
 Christian anarchism
 Christian liberty
 Christian–Jewish reconciliation
 Covenant (biblical)
 Do what thou wilt
 Frankism
 Free Grace theology
 Heterodoxy
 Historical reliability of the Acts of the Apostles
 Legalism (theology)
 Libertine
 Minuth
 Montanism
 Neonomianism
 Sovereign citizen movement
 Supersessionism

Footnotes

References

Sources

 Badenas, Robert. Christ the End of the Law, Romans 10.4 in Pauline Perspective. Sheffield (UK): JSOT Press, 1985  argues that telos is correctly translated as goal, not end, so that Christ is the goal of the Law, end of the law would be antinomianism.
 Bar-Asher, Me'ir Mikha'el and Kofsky, Aryeh. The Nuṣayrī-ʿAlawī Religion: An Enquiry into its Theology and Liturgy. Leiden: Koninklijke Brill NV, 2002. .
 Chittick, William C. The Sufi Path of Knowledge: Ibn Al-Arabi's Metaphysics of Imagination. Albany: State University of New York Press, 1989. .
 Clarence-Smith, W.G. Islam and the Abolition of Slavery. London: C. Hurst & Co. (Publishers) Ltd, 2006. .
 Daftary, Farhad; ed. Mediaeval Ismaʿili History and Thought. Cambridge: Cambridge University Press, 1996. .
 Dunn, James D.G. Jesus, Paul and the Law 1990 
 Encyclopaedia of the Orient. "Isma'ilism ". Retrieved 10 October 2006.
 Freedman, David Noel, editor. (1998). Anchor Bible Dictionary, article on Antinomianism by Hall, Robert W., 
 G. Kawerau, in A. Hauck's Realencyklopadie (1896)
 J. C. L. Gieseler, Ch. Hist. (New York ed. 1868, vol. iv.)
 J. H. Blunt Dict. of Doct. and Hist. Theol. (1872)
 Luther, Martin. Only the Decalogue Is Eternal: Martin Luther's Complete Antinomian Theses and Disputations. Minneapolis: Lutheran Press, 2008. 
 Peter Linebaugh and Marcus Rediker. The Many-Headed Hydra. Beacon Press, Boston, 2000
 Pratt, Douglas. The Challenge of Islam: Encounters in Interfaith Dialogue. Aldershot, Hampshire: Ashgate Publishing Limited, 2005. .
 Riess, in I. Goschler's Dict. Encyclop. de la théol. cath. (1858)
 Schimmel, Annemarie. Mystical Dimensions of Islam. .
 Weir, Anthony. "Differences Between Bektashism and Islamic Orthodoxy" in The Bektashi Order of Dervishes . Retrieved 10 October 2006.

External links

  Benjamin Brown, 'The Two Faces of Religious Radicalism – Orthodox Zealotry and Holy Sinning in Nineteenth Century Hasidism in Hungary and Galicia'
 Catholic Catechism on The Moral Law 
 Catholic Encyclopedia: Moral Aspect of Divine Law
 Catholic Encyclopedia: Mosaic Legislation
 Henry Eyster Jacobs, Lutheran Cyclopedia p. 18, "Antinomianism"
 Jewish Encyclopedia: Antinomianism
 Jewish Encyclopedia: Jesus: Attitude Toward the Law
 Jewish Encyclopedia: New Testament – For and Against the Law
 Jewish Encyclopedia: Saul of Tarsus: Paul's Opposition to the Law
 New Perspective on Paul
 Schaff-Herzog Encyclopedia of Religious Knowledge: Antinomianism
 Sermon on Antinomianism

Christian anti-Gnosticism
Salvation in Protestantism
Christian terminology
Early Christianity and Gnosticism
Religious ethics
Mosaic law in Christian theology
Heresy in Christianity